Gintarė Venčkauskaitė (born 4 November 1992 in Klaipėda) is a Lithuanian modern pentathlete.

Biography 
She competed in 2010 Youth Olympics and reached 6th place. In 2011 World Championships she was 37th, while winning the national championship. Venčkauskaitė had her first Olympic Games participation in 2012, finishing 12th.

References

External links
 

1992 births
Living people
Sportspeople from Klaipėda
Sportspeople from Vilnius
Lithuanian female modern pentathletes
Modern pentathletes at the 2010 Summer Youth Olympics
Modern pentathletes at the 2012 Summer Olympics
Modern pentathletes at the 2020 Summer Olympics
Olympic modern pentathletes of Lithuania